The Minnesota Landscape Arboretum is a  horticultural garden and arboretum located about  west of Chanhassen, Minnesota at 3675 Arboretum Drive, Chaska, Minnesota. It is part of the Department of Horticultural Science in the College of Food, Agricultural and Natural Resource Sciences at the University of Minnesota, and open to the public every day of the year except Thanksgiving and Christmas. An admission fee is charged, and annual memberships are available. It is the Upper Midwest's largest public garden.

The arboretum's earliest area was established in 1907 as the Horticultural Research Center, which developed cold-hardy crops such as the Honeycrisp apple and Northern Lights azaleas. In 1958 the arboretum itself was begun on  founded by Leon C. Snyder. The arboretum is the largest, most diverse, and most complete horticultural site in Minnesota, with over 5000 plant varieties, and approaching its goal of protecting its entire watershed (1200 acres).

The arboretum features annual and perennial display gardens, plants developed for northern climates, demonstration gardens, the Harrison Sculpture Garden, a Japanese garden, a Chinese garden, a maze garden and natural areas including woodlands, prairie, and marshes. Its collections include clematis, dahlias, ornamental grasses, hostas, iris, wildflowers, and cultivated and hardy shrub roses. Recent additions to the arboretum include the Farm at the Arb and the Tashjian Bee and Pollinator Discovery Center. The arboretum also includes a horticultural library and conservatory, as well as miles of hiking and cross-country skiing trails.

The Meyers-Deats Conservatory features bromeliad, orchid, and cactus collections and tropical houseplants.  The Andersen Horticultural Library houses 15,000 books covering botany, horticulture, natural history, children's literature, research materials, and nursery catalogs.

A Three-Mile (5 km) Drive through the arboretum takes visitors past many of the collections. Walkers will enjoy the arboretum's Three-Mile Walk, which winds its way through many plant collections. Guided tours are available at extra cost, and may be taken by tram, bus, or on foot.

See also 
 List of botanical gardens in the United States
 Leon C. Snyder

External links
Minnesota Landscape Arboretum

Arboreta in Minnesota
Asian-American culture in Minnesota
Botanical gardens in Minnesota
University of Minnesota
Protected areas of Carver County, Minnesota
Japanese gardens in the United States
Greenhouses in Minnesota